Cassie Premo Steele (born April 13, 1967, in Detroit, Michigan) is a Pushcart-Prize nominated poet, novelist, and author. Steele is a contributor to HuffPost and Medium  and from 2009 to 2015 she wrote a column for Literary Mama called “Birthing the Mother Writer”. Her writing focuses on themes of intersectionality, ecofeminism, and collective trauma. From 2009 to 2013, she was the host of The Co-Creating Show podcast. In 2013, she was a TEDx speaker on “Writing as a Way of Calming, Centering and Making Meaning”.

Education 
Steele attended the University of Virginia from 1985 to 1989, majoring in Comparative Literature and minoring in French and graduating Magna Cum Laude. She went on to earn an M.A. in Comparative Literature from the University of South Carolina in 1991 and then a Ph.D. in Comparative Literature and Women's, Gender, and Sexuality Studies from Emory University in Atlanta, Georgia, in 1996.

Published works

Nonfiction 

 Moon Days: Creative Writings about Menstruation. Summerhouse Press, 1999. Distributed by Ash Tree Publishing. 
 We Heal From Memory: Sexton, Lorde, Anzaldúa and the Poetry of Witness. Palgrave, 2000. 
 Easyhard: Reflections on the Practice of Creativity. WordClay, 2009. ISBN
 My Peace: A Year of Yoga at Amsa Studios. WordClay, 2008.
 Earth Joy Writing: creating balance through journaling and nature. Ashland Creek Press, 2015.

Poetry 

 Ruin.  
 New Women’s Voices Series by Finishing Line Press, 2004. Released as a Kindle edition in 2013.
 This is How Honey Runs. Unbound Content, 2010. 
 The Pomegranate Papers. Unbound Content, 2012. 
 Wednesday. Unbound Content, 2013. 
 Beautiful Waters. Finishing Line Press, 2016.
 Tongues in Trees | Poems 1994–2017. Unbound Content, 2017. 
 In March We Fell in Love. samfiftyfour, 2020. 
 Anne Sexton and Ralph Waldo Emerson Ride a Donkey into Heaven. samfiftyfour, 2021.

Fiction 
 Shamrock and Lotus. All Things That Matter Press, 2010. 
 The ReSisters. All Things That Matter Press, 2018.

References

Writers from Detroit
University of Virginia alumni
University of South Carolina alumni
Emory University alumni
Living people
1967 births
American women poets
American women novelists
American women non-fiction writers
20th-century American poets
20th-century American non-fiction writers
21st-century American poets
21st-century American novelists
21st-century American non-fiction writers
21st-century American women writers
Poets from Michigan
Novelists from Michigan
HuffPost writers and columnists